The 1971 Baltimore mayoral election saw the election of William Donald Schaefer.

Nominations
Primary elections were held September 14.

Democratic primary

Republican primary

General election
The general election was held November 6.

References

Baltimore mayoral
Mayoral elections in Baltimore
Baltimore